Sanjay Gandhi Memorial College, established in 1980, is a general degree college in Ranchi, Jharkhand state of India. This college is managed by Jharkhand Social And Educational Development Association. It provides undergraduate education in arts, commerce and sciences, and affiliated to  Ranchi University.

Departments

Science
Chemistry 
Physics 
Mathematics 
Botany 
Zoology

Arts and Commerce
Hindi
English
Sanskrit
History
Political Science
Philosophy
Anthropology
Geography
Economics
Psychology
Home Science
Commerce

See also
Education in India
Ranchi University
Literacy in India
List of institutions of higher education in Jharkhand

References

External links
 http://www.sgmcollegeranchi.org/

Colleges affiliated to Ranchi University
Educational institutions established in 1980
Universities and colleges in Ranchi
Universities and colleges in Jharkhand
1980 establishments in Bihar